Camplin is a surname. Notable people with the surname include:

 Alisa Camplin (born 1974), Australian aerial skier
 Bonnie Camplin (born 1970), British artist and university lecturer

See also
 DPP v Camplin, 1978 British lawsuit